Mária Zakariás (born December 28, 1952) is a Hungarian sprint canoer who competed from the mid-1970s to the early 1980s. She won a bronze medal in the K-2 500 m event at the 1980 Summer Olympics in Moscow.

Zakariás also won three medals at the ICF Canoe Sprint World Championships with a silver (K-4 500 m: 1973) and two bronzes (K-2 500 m: 1974, K-4 500 m: 1975).

References

Sports-reference.com profile

1952 births
Canoeists at the 1980 Summer Olympics
Hungarian female canoeists
Living people
Olympic canoeists of Hungary
Olympic bronze medalists for Hungary
Olympic medalists in canoeing
ICF Canoe Sprint World Championships medalists in kayak
Medalists at the 1980 Summer Olympics